John Sturdy may refer to:
 John Henry Sturdy, Saskatchewan politician
 John V. M. Sturdy, British academic